The Moscow Virtuosi is a chamber orchestra founded in 1979 by Vladimir Spivakov, who has been the orchestra's conductor, soloist and creative director ever since.

In 1982, the orchestra received the name "State Chamber Orchestra of the Ministry of Culture of the USSR "Moscow Virtuosi".

Since 1989, the Moscow Virtuosi have participated  annually in the International Music Festival in Colmar, France, where Maestro Spivakov is the Artistic Director.

In 1990, upon invitation of Felipe, Prince of Asturias, the orchestra have left to Spain, but kept performing both in Russia and all over the world. In 1999, the orchestra returned to Russia.

In 2003, the orchestra received their own headquarters at Moscow International House of Music, where Vladimir Spivakov is one of the co-founders.

External links
 Official website

Russian orchestras
Chamber orchestras
1979 establishments in the Soviet Union
Musical groups from Moscow
Musical groups established in 1979